Point of information may refer to:
Point of information (competitive debate)
Point of information in parliamentary procedure -- now known as Request for information (parliamentary procedure)